Payton v. New York, 445 U.S. 573 (1980), was a United States Supreme Court case concerning warrantless entry into a private home in order to make a felony arrest. The Court struck down a New York statute providing for such warrantless entries because the Fourth Amendment draws a firm line at the entrance to the house. Absent exigent circumstances, that threshold may not be reasonably crossed without a warrant. The court, however, did specify that an arrest warrant (as opposed to a search warrant) would have sufficed for entry into the suspect's residence if there had been reason to believe that the suspect was within the home.

Payton and related case law establish that the principle that a person in a home, particularly his or her own, is entitled Fourth Amendment protections not afforded to persons in automobiles, as per Whren v. United States, or to persons in public, as per United States v. Watson.

Background
Theodore Payton of New York City was suspected of murdering an employee of a gas station in the city. Thinking Payton was home, the New York City police "forcibly entered Payton's home." Payton was in fact not home, and the police gathered evidence from his home connecting him to the murder of the gas station attendant. The police acted under a New York law "allowing police to enter a private residence to make a felony arrest without a warrant." At his trial, Payton was unable to have the evidence thrown out, and his conviction was upheld at the appellate level. The judge noted that the police entering Payton's house was "authorized by the New York law" and therefore was permissible.

See also
List of United States Supreme Court cases, volume 445
Miller v. United States, 
Ker v. California,

References

Further reading

External links
 
 

United States Supreme Court cases
United States Supreme Court cases of the Burger Court
United States Fourth Amendment case law
1980 in United States case law